UGENE is computer software for bioinformatics. It works on personal computer operating systems such as Windows, macOS, or Linux. It is released as free and open-source software, under a GNU General Public License (GPL) version 2.

UGENE helps biologists to analyze various biological genetics data, such as sequences, annotations, multiple alignments, phylogenetic trees, NGS assemblies, and others. The data can be stored both locally (on a personal computer) and on a shared storage (e.g., a lab database).

UGENE integrates dozens of well-known biological tools, algorithms, and original tools in the context of genomics, evolutionary biology, virology, and other branches of life science. UGENE provides a graphical user interface (GUI) for the pre-built tools so biologists with no computer programming skills can access those tools more easily.

Using UGENE Workflow Designer, it is possible to streamline a multi-step analysis. The workflow consists of blocks such as data readers, blocks executing embedded tools and algorithms, and data writers. Blocks can be created with command line tools or a script. A set of sample workflows is available in the Workflow Designer, to annotate sequences, convert data formats, analyze NGS data, etc.

Beside the graphical interface, UGENE also has a command-line interface. Workflows may also be executed thereby.

To improve performance, UGENE uses multi-core processors (CPUs) and graphics processing units (GPUs) to optimize a few algorithms.

Key features 
The software supports the following features:
 Create, edit, and annotate nucleic acid and protein sequences
 Fast search in a sequence
 Multiple sequence alignment: Clustal W and O, MUSCLE, Kalign, MAFFT, T-Coffee
 Create and use shared storage, e.g., lab database
 Search through online databases: National Center for Biotechnology Information (NCBI), Protein Data Bank (PDB), UniProtKB/Swiss-Prot, UniProtKB/TrEMBL, DAS servers
 Local and NCBI Genbank BLAST search
 Open reading frame finder 
 Restriction enzyme finder with integrated REBASE restriction enzymes list
 Integrated Primer3 package for PCR primer design
 Plasmid construction and annotation
 Cloning in silico by designing of cloning vectors 
 Genome mapping of short reads with Bowtie, BWA, and UGENE Genome Aligner
 Visualize next generation sequencing data (BAM files) using UGENE Assembly Browser
 Variant calling with SAMtools
 RNA-Seq data analysis with Tuxedo pipeline (TopHat, Cufflinks, etc.)
 ChIP-seq data analysis with Cistrome pipeline (MACS, CEAS, etc.)
 Raw NGS data processing
 HMMER 2 and 3 packages integration
 Chromatogram viewer
 Search for transcription factor binding sites (TFBS) with weight matrix and SITECON algorithms
 Search for direct, inverted, and tandem repeats in DNA sequences
 Local sequence alignment with optimized Smith-Waterman algorithm
 Build (using integrated PHYLIP neighbor joining, MrBayes, or PhyML Maximum Likelihood) and edit phylogenetic trees
 Combine various algorithms into custom workflows with UGENE Workflow Designer
 Contigs assembly with CAP3
 3D structure viewer for files in Protein Data Bank (PDB) and Molecular Modeling Database (MMDB) formats, anaglyph view support
 Predict protein secondary structure with GOR IV and PSIPRED algorithms
 Construct dot plots for nucleic acid sequences
 mRNA alignment with Spidey
 Search for complex signals with ExpertDiscovery
 Search for a pattern of various algorithms' results in a nucleic acid sequence with UGENE Query Designer
 PCR in silico for primer designing and mapping
 Spade de novo assembler

Sequence View
The Sequence View is used to visualize, analyze and modify nucleic acid or protein sequences. Depending on the sequence type and the options selected, the following views can be present in the Sequence View window:
 3D structure view
 Circular view
 Chromatogram view
 Graphs View: GC-content, AG-content, and other
 Dot plot view

Alignment Editor

The Alignment Editor allows working with multiple nucleic acid or protein sequences - aligning them, editing the alignment, analyzing it, storing the consensus sequence, building a phylogenetic tree, and so on.

Phylogenetic Tree Viewer
The Phylogenetic Tree Viewer helps to visualize and edit phylogenetic trees. It is possible to synchronize a tree with the corresponding multiple alignment used to build the tree.

Assembly Browser

The Assembly Browser project was started in 2010 as an entry for Illumina iDEA Challenge 2011. The browser allows users to visualize and browse large (up to hundreds of millions of short reads) next generation sequence assemblies. It supports SAM, BAM (the binary version of SAM), and ACE formats. Before browsing assembly data in UGENE, an input file is converted to a UGENE database file automatically. This approach has its pros and cons. The pros are that this allows viewing the whole assembly, navigating in it, and going to well-covered regions rapidly. The cons are that a conversion may take time for a large file, and needs enough disk space to store the database.

Workflow Designer

UGENE Workflow Designer allows creating and running complex computational workflow schemas.

The distinguishing feature of Workflow Designer, relative to other bioinformatics workflow management systems is that workflows are executed on a local computer. It helps to avoid data transfer issues, whereas other tools’ reliance on remote file storage and internet connectivity does not.

The elements that a workflow consists of correspond to the bulk of algorithms integrated into UGENE. Using Workflow Designer also allows creating custom workflow elements. The elements can be based on a command-line tool or a script.

Workflows are stored in a special text format. This allows their reuse, and transfer between users.

A workflow can be run using the graphical interface or launched from the command line. The graphical interface also allows controlling the workflow execution, storing the parameters, and so on.

There is an embedded library of workflow samples to convert, filter, and annotate data, with several pipelines to analyze NGS data developed in collaboration with NIH NIAID. A wizard is available for each workflow sample.

Supported biological data formats
 Sequences and annotations: FASTA (.fa), GenBank (.gb), EMBL (.emb), GFF (.gff)
 Multiple sequence alignments: Clustal (.aln), MSF (.msf), Stockholm (.sto), Nexus (.nex)
 3D structures: PDB (.pdb), MMDB (.prt)
 Chromatograms: ABIF (.abi), SCF (.scf)
 Short reads: Sequence Alignment/Map(SAM) (.sam), binary version of SAM (.bam), ACE (.ace), FASTQ (.fastq)
 Phylogenetic trees: Newick (.nwk), PHYLIP (.phy)
 Other formats: Bairoch (enzymes info), HMM (HMMER profiles), PWM and PFM (position matrices), SNP and VCF4 (genome variations)

Release cycle
UGENE is primarily developed by Unipro LLC with headquarters in Akademgorodok of Novosibirsk, Russia. Each iteration lasts about 1–2 months, followed by a new release. Development snapshots may also be downloaded.

The features to include in each release are mostly initiated by users.

See also
 Sequence alignment software
 Bioinformatics
 Computational biology
 List of open source bioinformatics software

References

External links
 
 , UniPro
 UGENE podcast
 UGENE documentation
 UGENE forum
 Лучший свободный проект России | Журнал Linux Format - все о Linux по-русски
 

Phylogenetics software
Computational science
Free science software
Free software programmed in C++
Russian inventions